Breaking Away is a 1979 film.

Breaking Away may also refer to:

 Breaking Away (TV series), a 1980 series based on the film
 Breaking Away (Tantrum album), 2005
 Breaking Away (Jaki Graham album), 1986 which includes a song of the same name
 Otryvayas (Breaking Away), an album by Mashina Vremeni
 "Breaking Away", a song by Ratatat from Ratatat
 "Breaking Away", a song by Status Quo from Whatever You Want

See also 
 Breakin' Away (disambiguation)
 Breakaway (disambiguation)